David Alan Sklansky is an American lawyer who is currently the Stanley Morrison Professor of Law at Stanford Law School (since 2014).

Early life
Sklansky grew up in Newport Beach, California.

Education
A.B. in Biophysics, Highest Honors, UC Berkeley, 1981
JD, Harvard University, magna cum laude, 1984

Career
Sklansky taught at U.C. Berkeley and UCLA before teaching at Stanford. Before teaching, he practiced labor law in Washington, D.C. and served as an Assistant United States Attorney in Los Angeles.

Selected publications
David A. Sklansky, Cocaine, Race and Equal Protection, 47 Stan. L. Rev. 1283 (1995).

References

Year of birth missing (living people)
Living people
Stanford Law School faculty
American lawyers
University of California, Berkeley alumni
Harvard Law School alumni
UC Berkeley School of Law faculty
University of California, Los Angeles faculty